George I (Giorgi I; died 1392), of the Bagrationi dynasty, was king of western Georgian kingdom of Imereti from 1389 to 1392.

George was born into the family of Bagrat I, the duke (and ex-king) of Imereti, and his wife, of the Jaqeli family of Samtskhe. He succeeded as king of Imereti on the death of his elder brother, Alexander I, who had proclaimed himself king in opposition to King Bagrat V of Georgia during Timur's invasion of the country. Unlike his predecessor, George initially enjoyed more success in consolidating his power over Imereti; more fortresses were seized from Bagrat's loyalists and his protégé, Arsen, was installed as catholicos of the church in 1390. In 1392, he led his army to subdue Vameq I Dadiani, Duke of Mingrelia, but he suffered a crushing defeat and was killed on the battlefield. At Vameq's invitation, Bagrat V's son, George VII, occupied Imereti, reuniting it with the Kingdom of Georgia. George's brother, Constantine, and nephew, Demetrius, son of Alexander, fled to the North Caucasus, in the Balkar lands (Basiani of the Georgian sources).

References

Kings of Imereti
14th-century monarchs in the Middle East
Bagrationi dynasty of the Kingdom of Imereti
Eastern Orthodox monarchs
1392 deaths

Year of birth unknown
14th-century people from Georgia (country)
Monarchs killed in action